The 2002 UEC European Track Championships were the European Championships for track cycling, for junior and under 23 riders. They took place in Büttgen, Germany.

Medal summary

Open

Under 23

Juniors

Medal table

References

European Track Championships, 2002
European Track Championships
2002 in German sport
Rhein-Kreis Neuss
International cycle races hosted by Germany